Pretty Little Mistakes is a book written by Heather McElhatton and published on May 1, 2007 by HarperCollins.

The novel is written in Second-person narrative and allows the reader to direct where the story will go, similar to the Choose Your Own Adventure book series.  The book has more than 150 possible endings.  50% of the endings are "good" and 50% are "bad".  After an introduction to the story, the reader is asked to determine the protagonist's next course of action. After the reader makes a choice, the plot branches out leading to more decisions and eventually multiple possible endings.  Endings include the death of the protagonist and/or companions of the main character.

References 

2007 American novels
Gamebooks
HarperCollins books
Fiction with alternate endings